Irion County is a county located on the Edwards Plateau in the U.S. state of Texas. As of the 2020 census, its population was 1,513. Its county seat is Mertzon. The county is named for Robert Anderson Irion, a secretary of state of the Republic of Texas.

Irion County is included in the San Angelo metropolitan statistical area.

History

From 1858 to 1861, Butterfield Overland Mail crossed the region.

In 1876, John Arden brought the first flock of sheep from California, and Billy Childress established the Longhorn 7D Ranch.

The Texas Legislature formed Irion County from Tom Green County in 1889. Sherwood became the county seat.

Oil was discovered in Irion County in 1928.

In 1936, Mertzon became the county seat.

Currently, the Old Irion County Courthouse in Sherwood is the only property in the county listed on the National Register of Historic Places.

Geography
The Spraberry Trend, the third-largest oil field in the United States by remaining reserves, underlies much of the county.

Major highways
  U.S. Highway 67
  State Highway 163

Adjacent counties
 Tom Green County (north and east)
 Schleicher County (southeast)
 Crockett County (southwest)
 Reagan County (west)

Demographics

Note: the US Census treats Hispanic/Latino as an ethnic category. This table excludes Latinos from the racial categories and assigns them to a separate category. Hispanics/Latinos can be of any race.

As of the census of 2000,  1,771 people, 694 households, and 523 were families residing in the county.  The population density was two people per square mile (1/km2).  The 914 housing units averaged one per square mile (0/km2).  The racial makeup of the county was 90.68% White, 0.40% African American, 0.79% Native American, 6.55% from other races, and 1.58% from two or more races.  About 24.62% of the population was Hispanic or Latino of any race.

Of the 694 households, 32.40% had children under the age of 18 living with them, 64.80% were married couples living together, 6.60% had a female householder with no husband present, and 24.50% were not families. About 21.80% of all households were made up of individuals, and 11.20% had someone living alone who was 65 years of age or older.  The average household size was 2.55, and the average family size was 2.97.

In the county, the age distribution was  26.70% under 18, 4.70% from 18 to 24, 26.90% from 25 to 44, 26.10% from 45 to 64, and 15.60% who were 65 or older.  The median age was 40 years. For every 100 females, there were 100.30 males.  For every 100 females age 18 and over, there were 99.40 males.

Males had a median income of $35,642 versus $20,395 for females. The per capita income for the county was $20,515. About 8.30% of families and 8.40% of the population were below the poverty line, including 7.20% of those under age 18 and 7.90% of those age 65 or over.

Communities
 Barnhart
 Mertzon (county seat)
 Sherwood

Notable native
 Laura Bullion, female Old West outlaw, born in Knickerbocker.

Politics
As of 2017, only Irion County had stated it would refuse to issue licenses to same-sex couples. Many counties started issuing same-sex marriage licenses within hours of the Obergefell ruling on June 26, 2015, while others awaited direction from state officials, local county attorney advice, or issuance of corrected state marriage license forms. Irion County adopted this reason for not issuing licenses. No marriage applications have yet been made by same-sex couples in Irion County. Irion County was the sole holdout in Texas, with reports that the situation was still in effect two years later. When Alabama replaced marriage licenses with marriage certificates and required that all counties issue them, Irion County became the only remaining county in the country that would not allow same-sex couples to marry. As of 2020, Irion County has a new county clerk who has stated she would issue marriage licenses to same-sex couples.

Irion County was one of four Texas counties Ross Perot won in the 1992 presidential election. Otherwise, the county, like most of rural Texas, is extremely Republican. It has not voted for a Democratic presidential candidate since Texas native Lyndon B. Johnson won a statewide and national landslide in 1964.

See also

 List of museums in West Texas
 National Register of Historic Places listings in Irion County, Texas
 Recorded Texas Historic Landmarks in Irion County

References

External links 
 Irion County government website
 
 Inventory of county records, Irion County courthouse, Mertzon, Texas, hosted by the Portal to Texas History
 Irion County Profile from the Texas Association of Counties 

 
Texas counties
1889 establishments in Texas
Populated places established in 1889